is a Paralympian athlete from Japan competing mainly in category T52 sprint events.

She competed in the 2008 Summer Paralympics in Beijing, China. There she won a silver medal in the women's 100 metres - T52 event and a silver medal in the women's 200 metres - T52 event

External links
 

Paralympic athletes of Japan
Athletes (track and field) at the 2008 Summer Paralympics
Paralympic silver medalists for Japan
Year of birth missing (living people)
Living people
Medalists at the 2008 Summer Paralympics
Paralympic medalists in athletics (track and field)